KIOO (99.7 FM) is a classic rock formatted broadcast radio station licensed to Porterville, California, serving the Visalia/Tulare area.  KIOO is owned and operated by Momentum Broadcasting LP.

External links
99.7 Classic Rock Online

IOO
Classic rock radio stations in the United States
Mass media in Tulare County, California
Porterville, California
Radio stations established in 1990
1990 establishments in California